Carol Isherwood OBE (born 27 July 1961) is an English former rugby union player and a founding member of the Rugby Football Union for Women. She captained  against  in 1986. She then captained  in their first game against  a year later.

Isherwood was born in Leigh, Greater Manchester, England. She first became involved in rugby in 1981 while studying at Leeds University when she set up a women’s team. Carol graduated from Leeds in History 1982, followed by a PGCE in 1984.
Ishwerwood was appointed an Officer of the Order of the British Empire (OBE) in the 2003 Birthday Honours for services to women's rugby. Isherwood was the first woman appointed to the IRB Rugby Committee in September 2009. She was one of the first six women inducted into the IRB Hall of Fame in November 2014.

References

1961 births
Living people
Alumni of the University of Leeds
England women's international rugby union players
English female rugby union players
Rugby union players from Leigh, Greater Manchester
World Rugby Hall of Fame inductees
Officers of the Order of the British Empire